Thyreus lugubris, is a species of Australian native bee belonging to the family Apidae subfamily Apinae.

Common name: Domino Cuckoo Bee.  

As with the other bees in this genus, Thyreus lugubris is cleptoparasitic.  The hosts for the Thyreus genus are bees of the Amegilla genus.  Thyreus lugubris specifically targets the Teddy Bear Bees, Amegilla bombiformis. 

Females may be seen flying close to the ground searching for a host nest.  Once a suitable nest is found, the female will enter it, while the host parent is absent and bite a hole through the cap of a recently closed cell.  It then places its abdomen through the hole and lays an egg close to the host egg before repairing the breach to the cell.[2]

References

2. A guide to Native Bees of Australia by Terry Houston

Apinae
Insects described in 1879